Fatal Frame is a survival horror video game developed by Tecmo for the PlayStation 2. The first installment in the Fatal Frame / Project Zero series, it was released in 2001 in Japan and 2002 in North America and Europe. An enhanced port for the Xbox was released in 2002 in North America and 2003 in Japan and Europe. The game was published for both systems by Tecmo in Japan and North America. In Europe, the PlayStation 2 version was published by Wanadoo, and the Xbox version by Microsoft. It was re-released in North America on the PlayStation Network in 2013.

Set in the year 1986, the story follows siblings Miku and Mafuyu Hinasaki. When Mafuyu disappears while searching for a famous novelist in the haunted Himuro Mansion, his sister Miku goes to find him. During her exploration of the mansion, she discovers clues as to the fate of those who entered, must fight hostile ghosts, and discover the truth behind a dark ritual that took place there. The gameplay focuses on the siblings exploring the mansion, and fighting off hostile ghosts using a special camera.

Development began after the PlayStation 2 hardware was introduced to Tecmo, using the codename "Project Zero". The concept was created by Makoto Shibata based on his own spiritual experiences. Together with producer Keisuke Kikuchi, Shibata worked on creating the scariest gaming experience possible. Multiple aspects of its style and production were influenced by this development wish. Under its working title by then in 2001, it was eventually confirmed for release in Western territories a month after its Japanese release, where it was marketed as being based on a true story. The game received generally positive reviews, while the port drew praise for its improved visuals. As of 2015, four more games in the Fatal Frame series have been released.

Gameplay

Fatal Frame / Project Zero is a survival horror video game set within an abandoned Japanese mansion, divided into a prologue and four chapters which act as the tutorial and levels respectively. The player controls Miku Hinasaki for the majority of the game, with its opening featuring Miku's brother Mafuyu as the player character. Each part of the mansion includes a map of its layout, and each level is rendered in real-time instead of using pre-rendered backgrounds. During navigation, players guide the characters through multiple rooms, each with a semi-fixed camera perspective that changes depending on a character's position. Environments are invariably dark, with exploration being possible through the use of a flashlight. During exploration, various items can be found scattered through environments: these include documents and cassette recordings expanding on elements of the story, health items, and other objects. In some areas, the main character must also solve puzzles to progress. Progress is saved at savepoints through the mansion, and at the end of each chapter.

Hostile ghosts can only be fought using the Camera Obscura, an antique camera that can capture ghosts. Ghosts in environments are sensed using a character's "sixth sense", and will drain a character's health on contact. When using the Camera, the view switches to a first-person view: the Camera Obscura is moved with the right analog stick on a controller, while the character can be moved with the left stick while maintaining a view through the Camera. Holding a ghost in view enables greater damage, but ghosts fade in and out of view as they approach. The most damage is dealt when the ghost is very close. The amount of damage taken is converted into points, which are used to upgrade the camera for faster reload time or greater damage with each shot, or adding secondary powers such as staggering ghosts when shooting them. Points are also gained by photographing benign ghosts that appear in set spots around the mansion. Film, the Camera's ammunition, can be found throughout the mansion or be replenished at a save point: it comes in various grades, with higher-quality grades dealing higher damage while consequently being rarer.

Synopsis
The story, set in the year 1986, focuses on Miku and Mafuyu Hinasaki, siblings with the ability to see supernatural events. When Mafuyu disappears in the haunted Himuro Mansion searching for his tutor Junsei Takamine and his assistants, Miku goes to Himuro Mansion. As she explores the mansion, Miku discovers signs that Takamine's party were killed by the mansion's ghosts, and finds rope burns appearing on her wrists and ankles. Further exploration through the mansion turns up information on a dark ritual that took place within Himuro Mansion: a chosen shrine maiden was torn apart using ropes attached to her limbs and neck in the so-called "Strangling Ritual", then the ropes that killed her were soaked in her blood and used to seal the Hell Gate, a portal to the afterlife that keeps a dark force known as "the Malice" and the dead from escaping into the living world.

The last time the ritual was performed, the sacrifice was Kirie Himuro. Shortly before she took part in the ritual, she fell in love with a visitor to the mansion. Fearing that Kirie would not want to perform the ritual, the Master of the Himuro Mansion has the visitor killed and lies to Kirie, telling her that the visitor has left. However, she does find out the visitor's fate and as feared does not want to perform the ritual. This caused the ritual to fail and the Malice to leak out, killing everyone in Himuro Mansion and causing the ghosts to remain there and attack anyone who explored there. Mafuyu was captured by Kirie due to his resemblance to her lover. Miku finally reaches the chamber of the Hell Gate, where she confronts Kirie's corrupted spirit. With her spirit calmed using an artifact called the Holy Mirror, Kirie accepts her duty as the Rope Shrine Maiden, keeping the Malice at bay for eternity. The ending then diverges depending on the game's difficulty. In the "Normal Mode" ending, Mafuyu stays behind with Kirie to keep her spirit company while Miku escapes the crumbling mansion. In the "Hard Mode" ending, Kirie convinces Mafuyu to escape with his sister. In both endings, the spirits trapped in the mansion are freed, while Miku loses her sixth sense. A third ending, exclusive to the Xbox version, sees the spirit of Kirie's lover returning to her while Miku and Mafuyu escape. According to staff, the first ending is canon and leads into the events of the third game.

Development
The concept for the game came to future director Makoto Shibata shortly after he finished work on Tecmo's Deception: Invitation to Darkness. The concept came to Shibata inspired by his own dreams and encounters with what he felt were supernatural occurrences. Development began when the PlayStation 2 hardware was first introduced to Tecmo, under the codename "Project Zero". One of the things they drew inspiration from was the positive reception of polygon characters in the Silent Hill series, using this to go a step further and create the sense of seeing things off-screen. The ultimate goal was to create as frightening an atmosphere as possible. The staff included multiple developers from the Deception series. According to character designer and CGI director Hitoshi Hasegawa, the game's key colors are black and white: white represented hope, while black represented fear. During early development, a large amount of effort went into adjusting the lighting and shading, with the most obvious in-game representation of the key colors and desired effect being Miku's torch piercing the darkness inside the mansion. In addition to black and white, a third key color represented through Miku's clothing was red, representing life. The composer and sound director was Shigekiyo Okuda. During the concept development, one of the main concepts was using stereophonic sound to reinforce the atmosphere. Due to the nature of the project, Okuda considered it important that they convey a three-dimensional feeling using sound projected from both left and right. After testing out multiple middleware and commercial sound tools, the team settled on Arnis Sound Technologies.

The setting of the game in a classical Japanese mansion originated from Shibata's early ideas for settings within the Deception series, although these ideas were passed over as it limited the possibilities for the series' trap-setting gameplay. When creating the atmosphere, the team watched both high and low-budget Japanese horror films, and war films. The script was written by Tsuyoshi Iuchi. The story was the first part of the game to be completed. The setting was originally going to be in the then-present day, but as the team wanted to create a feeling of isolation through a lack of modern technology such as mobile phones, the setting was changed to the 1980s. Some scenes were considered too graphic for the game and were cut: two cited examples were a flashback showing the head of the Himuro house committing seppuku, and another was a scene showing Kirie being torn apart during the Strangling Ritual. The way the Holy Mirror was broken also made a deliberate reference to how the ritual pulled the body into five pieces. While rituals form a core part of the story, the development team had little to no experience with such things. For inspiration, Shibata used similar motifs of spirituality in Yōkai Hunter, a manga written by Daijiro Morohoshi. The Camera Obscura was not in the initial discussions between Shibata and Kikuchi, with the original idea being that ghosts would be avoided and repelled by light. Ultimately, they decided to have a type of offensive power, which resulted in the Camera's creation. Kikuchi was initially opposed to the idea, but saw that it fitted very well into the game's context as development progressed. The Camera's design was based on a German military camera.

Release
The game was first announced in July 2001 for a winter release under the provisional title "Project Zero". The game's Japanese title was inspired by the nature of the game's enemies as "beings of nothingness", along with it representing the state of someone being at their utmost during a decisive moment. It could also be read alternately as "zero" and "ghost". The game was initially dated for December 7, but Tecmo later shifted the date forward to December 13. As part of the promotion campaign, two special giveaways were created and sold through Japanese media store Tsutaya: headphones given away to winners of a lottery, and a trial version available to rent. In addition to this, a novelization written from the point of view of Mafuyu was published by ASCII Media Works.

The game's release for North America was confirmed in January 2002 and was released in March 8. In Europe, it was published by Wanadoo, a publishing company based in France. Wanadoo had their eye on the game since its Japanese release, and took charge of its translation and promotion for the region. The title was marketed in the west as being based on a true story. While this was not true in itself, elements of the story were based on real haunted locations and local Japanese legends. Two cited examples were a haunted mansion said to be the site of numerous murders, and the legend of a tree from which a woman hanged herself when forcefully separated from her lover.

An expanded port for the Xbox, titled Fatal Frame Special Edition, was released in 2002 in North America and 2003 in Japan and Europe. The Japanese release used the game's American title as opposed to its Japanese title. Tecmo published the port in Japan and North America, while the game was published by Microsoft in Europe. The port featured graphical upgrades, new ghosts to fight, a redesigned interface for the camera, bonus costumes for Miku, and a new "Fatal" difficulty mode. Completing the game on this difficulty unlocked an art gallery. The game was re-released on the PlayStation Network for the PlayStation 3 in North America on April 9, 2013 as a PlayStation 2 Classic.

Reception

In its debut week in Japan, Fatal Frame sold 22,000 units, the lowest debut sales of the series. Its lifetime sales in the country have reached 42,000 units, also making it the lowest-selling title up to that point. Upon release on the PlayStation 2 in Europe, it sold 12,000 copies. According to an interview with Kikuchi and Shibata, the game was an unexpected success in both North America and Europe. The two attributed this to the recent popularity of Japanese horror films like Ring.

Famitsu praised the use of the Camera Obscura in creating a sense of tension in combination with the sound and visual design. IGN's David Smith, while noting some difficulties with the controls, generally praised its atmosphere and gameplay, saying that "horror fans are advised to pick this one up at their leisure, and even the jaded might find something to renew their interest in the genre". Chris Baker of 1UP.com similarly praised the atmosphere and enjoyed the gameplay, particularly noting its ability to make him feel like a newcomer to gaming with its late-game difficulty spike. GameSpy's Raina Lee, reviewing the Xbox version, called it "the only really scary game on the Xbox". Eurogamer's Rob Fahey, while initially wary of the game, was impressed by the game, calling it "compelling and utterly addictive" and citing multiple parallels with Ring. GamePro was less enthusiastic, saying that it did not hold up well alongside games like Silent Hill. Chris Hudak of Game Revolution particularly praised the game's atmosphere, but faulted the Camera Obscura's need for ghosts to be within the targeting area to score points, and some over-familiar elements similar to other horror games of the time. GameSpot's Miguel Lopez was generally positive, enjoying the game despite faulting some of the textures and particle effects: in conclusion, he said that fans of the Resident Evil and Silent Hill series would enjoy the game.

Impressions of the Xbox port were also positive, with multiple reviewers noting improved textures and expanded features over the original release. Lee was particularly positive about the improvements despite them not being substantial when compared to other expanded re-releases of the time, recommending it to players who had yet to try the original version. IGN's Aaron Boulding likewise noted the graphical upgrade, while saying that players of the original version would find little to attract them again aside from the new difficulty mode. Eurogamer's Kristan Reed, echoing Fahey's sentiments about the game, called it one of the best games on the Xbox, positively noting the added features and graphical upgrade. GamePro, while again faulting it when compared to other horror games, was generally positive about the upgrade, calling it "a solid choice for horror fanatics, especially considering that genre offerings on the Xbox are few and far between". Ricardo Torres of GameSpot was less enthusiastic about the graphical upgrade, but praised the improved sound quality and called it a sound game in the genre.

Legacy
A sequel to the game, titled Fatal Frame II: Crimson Butterfly, was released in 2003 in North America and Japan, and 2004 in Europe. A sequel to both games, Fatal Frame III: The Tormented, was released in 2005 in Japan and North America, and 2006 in Europe. Crimson Butterfly takes place parallel to Fatal Frame / Project Zero, while The Tormented takes place two years later. Since the original game's release, the gameplay has remained generally unchanged, becoming a defining part of the series' identity.

Shortly after the game's release, a Hollywood film adaptation was announced in 2003. Based on the game's story and intended to be set in Japan as opposed to a western country, Robert Fyvolent and Mark R. Brinker were to be the writers and John Rogers was the producer. Steven Spielberg has been brought in to polish the script. After a long period of hiatus, the film was re-announced in 2014, this time produced by Samuel Hadida, and was set to begin production after the completion and release of Fatal Frame: Maiden of Black Water. A Japanese film adaptation was released in September 2014.

Notes

References

External links

  
  
  
  
 

2001 video games
2000s horror video games
Fatal Frame games
Mass murder in fiction
Video games about curses
Microsoft games
PlayStation 2 games
PlayStation Network games
Psychological horror games
Single-player video games
Survival video games
Tecmo games
Video games developed in Japan
Video games set in 1986
Video games set in Japan
Works set in country houses
Xbox games

ja:零 (ゲーム)#零 zero